Rutvand-e Ardeshir may refer to:
 Cheshmeh Kabud, Gilan-e Gharb
 Cheshmeh-ye Sangi-ye Rutvand